"You" is the debut single from the 2008 Australian Idol winner, Wes Carr. It was released digitally on 23 November 2008, and physically on 3 December 2008. It is the lead single from his second studio album, The Way the World Looks.

Track listing
CD single
 "You"
 "Get Back"
 "Desire"
 "If I Were A Carpenter"

Charts and certifications
The song debuted at #3 on the ARIA Singles Chart, before climbing to #2, then peaking at #1, in its third week, and certified Gold. It then fell to #2 for two weeks, and then spent its final week inside the top ten at #8.

Year-end charts

Certification

References

2008 singles
Wes Carr songs
Number-one singles in Australia
Songs written by Adam Argyle
2008 songs
Sony BMG singles